Assumption University may refer to:

 Assumption University (Worcester), Massachusetts, United States
 Assumption University (Windsor, Ontario), a federated college of University of Windsor, Canada
 Assumption University (Thailand)
 University of the Assumption, Philippines

See also
 Assumption College (disambiguation)